Nobelius Siding is situated on the Puffing Billy Railway in Emerald.  The siding was built in 1904 to service the adjacent packing shed, built the same year, from which nursery seedlings and plants were shipped throughout Australia by C.A. Nobelius' Gembrook Nurseries.  The Nobelius nursery was once the largest plant nursery in the Southern Hemisphere with 200,000 trees grown on 180 hectares.

The Packing Shed has been restored by Puffing Billy volunteers and is now used by the Railway as a function centre, particularly as venue for Puffing Billy’s various evening dining experiences, such as Murder on the Puffing Billy Express.

References

External links
 Melway map at street-directory.com.au

Tourist railway stations in Melbourne
Railway stations in the Shire of Yarra Ranges